Sâncraiu de Mureș (Hungarian pronunciation:  meaning "Holy King on the Mureș River") is a commune in Mureș County, Transylvania, Romania composed of two villages:
Nazna / Náznánfalva
Sâncraiu de Mureș

Around 1930, Cornățel (Egerszeg) village was merged into Sâncraiu de Mureș.

Demographics

The commune has an ethnically mixed population. According to the 2011 census, it has a population of 7,275 of which 64.52% or 4,694 are Romanians and 30.81% or 2,242 are Székely Hungarians.

See also 
 List of Hungarian exonyms (Mureș County)

References

Communes in Mureș County
Localities in Transylvania